Philip Francis Little (1824 – October 21, 1897) was the first Premier of Newfoundland between 1855 and 1858. He was born in Charlottetown, Prince Edward Island. Little studied law there with Charles Young and was admitted to the bar in 1844.

He came to Newfoundland in 1846 and articled in law, the first Roman Catholic to practise law in St. John's. His strong views on responsible government, his connections in St. John's Catholic society, and his ability to unite disparate elements of the Liberal Party propelled him to a leadership role in politics.

He helped lead the charge for responsible government along with John Kent. After it was granted in 1854, he went on to run a successful campaign as leader of the predominantly Roman Catholic Liberal Party. He became Newfoundland's first Premier in 1855 and served concurrently as the colony's Attorney-General. D.W. Prowse would record that it was, "as near to perfection as possible". With the period of 1855-1857 described as being "the sunshine of prosperity." Little only remained in office until July 15, 1858, when he resigned to be succeeded by John Kent.

He resigned in 1858 saying "I go now before the milk of Human kindness goes sour for me". He was right in that Newfoundland was about to enter an era of sectarian strife.

He was appointed as assistant justice on the Supreme Court of Newfoundland in September 1858 and became Chief Justice two months later. In 1861, riots broke out over disputed election results from Harbour Grace. Little, as Chief Justice, played a prominent role in dispersing and calming the crowds.

Personal life

He married Mary Jane Holdright, from a wealthy Anglo-Irish family, in 1864. Philip Little retired to Ireland in 1868 and worked for the Home Rule movement there. He and his wife had 13 children, the youngest of whom, Patrick, became a  politician. Philip Francis Little died at age 73 in 1897 in Monkstown, County Dublin.

References

Bibliography
 
Biography at The Canadian Encyclopedia

1824 births
1897 deaths
Premiers of Newfoundland Colony
People from Charlottetown
Colony of Prince Edward Island people
Canadian people of Irish descent
Canadian Roman Catholics
Canadian expatriates in Ireland
Persons of National Historic Significance (Canada)
British emigrants to pre-Confederation Newfoundland
Attorneys-General of Newfoundland Colony